Elachista serricornis is a moth of the family Elachistidae found in Europe.

Description
The head is grey, face whitish. Forewings in male grey, in female blackish-grey ; plical stigma black, elongate, followed by a white dot ; an oblique white triangular costal spot at 2/3 ; a small indistinct whitish tornal spot somewhat beyond it. Hindwings grey.grey.

Biology
The larvae feed on Carex elata, rare spring sedge (Carex ericetorum), Carex ferruginea, wood segge (Carex sylvatica), bladder sedge (Carex vesicaria), common cottongrass (Eriophorum angustifolium), Eriophorum latifolium, hare's-tail cottongrass (Eriophorum vaginatum) and Scirpus sylvaticus. Young larvae make a long, brown corridor, and hibernate in this. In spring, the larva makes a new mine in another leaf, starting near the base of the blade. The mine widens upwards and forms a blotch at the end. Pupation takes place outside of the mine.

Distribution
It is found from Fennoscandia and northern Russia to northern Italy and from Ireland to Poland and Hungary.

References

External links
 Elachista serricornis at UKmoths

serricornis
Leaf miners
Moths described in 1854
Moths of Europe
Taxa named by Henry Tibbats Stainton